Tyurkmen is a village in Southern Bulgaria, Plovdiv Province, Brezovo municipality. As of 15 June 2020, the current population of the village is 240 people. The village is located at an altitude of 196 meters above sea level.

Infrastructure 
There is a library but there is no school in the village. There are around 30 children in the village who travel on a daily basis to Brezovo to attend school. Due to the bad road conditions, the school bus often passed through the open fields, instead of the road. The transport is organized by the town hall. In 2018, villagers rose to a protest against dangerous road infrastructure between nearby villages. 

In 2014, an illegal Marijuana farmhouse was busted in the area by the police force. There is also a nearby dam with a large population of Carps, crucians, and redfin fish. There is a wide variety of bird species, living around it.

Nearby Sight Seeings 
In a neighboring village Granit, the oldest tree in Bulgaria can be found, a 1668 year old oak. The water springing in the area is also often referred to as the cleanest water in the country. The village used to have the largest almond plantations in Bulgaria.

Holidays 
The yearly festival of the village is on 20 October. On 1 February an honorary day of vineyards is held, when villagers plant vines and pour them with red wine for a ritual of better harvest.

References 

Villages in Plovdiv Province